The 1990–91 Argentine Primera B Nacional was the fifth season of second division professional of football in Argentina. A total of 22 teams competed; the champion and runner-up were promoted to Argentine Primera División.

Club information

Standings
Quilmes was declared champion and was automatically promoted to Primera División, and the teams placed 2nd to 10th qualified for the Second Promotion Playoff.

Second Promotion Playoff
The Second Promotion Playoff or Torneo Reducido was played by the teams placed 2nd to 11th in the overall standings: Atlético Tucumán (2nd), who entered in the Semifinals, Belgrano (3rd), who entered in the Second Round, and in the first round entered San Martín (T) (5th), Banfield (6th), Almirante Brown (7th), Instituto (8th), Douglas Haig (9th), Deportivo Morón (10th) and Atlético de Rafaela (11th), (Cipolletti (4th) did not qualify because it was relegated). In the first round also participated the champion of Primera B Metropolitana: Central Córdoba (R), and Nueva Chicago and San Martín (SJ), both winners of Zonales Noroeste y Sureste from Torneo del Interior. The winner was promoted to Primera División.

Bracket

1: Qualified because of sport advantage.
Note: The team in the first line plays at home the second leg.

Relegation

Note: Clubs with indirect affiliation with AFA are relegated to their respective league of his province according to the Argentine football league system, while clubs directly affiliated face relegation to Primera B Metropolitana. Clubs with direct affiliation are all from Greater Buenos Aires, with the exception of Newell's, Rosario Central, Central Córdoba and Argentino de Rosario, all from Rosario, and Unión and Colón from Santa Fe.

Additional Playoff
Since Central Córdoba (SdE) and Tigre finished with the same relegation co-efficient at the dividing line, a one-match playoff was held to determine who was relegated. Tigre lost so their got relegated to Primera B Metropolitana, while Central Cordoba (SdE) remained in Primera B Nacional.

Relegation Playoff Matches
Each tie was played on a home-and-away two-legged basis, but if the first match was won by the team of Primera B Nacional (who also played the first leg at home), there was no need to play the second. If instead, the team from the Regional leagues wins the first leg, the second leg must be played, leg that, if its won by the team of Primera B Nacional, a third leg must be played, if the third leg finishes in a tie, the team from Primera B Nacional remains on it.
This season Deportivo Maipú had to defend their spot in Primera B Nacional against Godoy Cruz from the Liga Mendocina de fútbol.

Deportivo Maipú remains in Primera B Nacional.

See also
1990–91 in Argentine football

References

External links

Primera B Nacional seasons
Prim
1990 in South American football leagues
1991 in South American football leagues